Dilip (Died 25 May 2012) was an Indian actor who starred in Tamil, Kannada, and Malayalam films.

Career

Dilip starred with Kamal Haasan in Varumayin Niram Sivappu. Dilip later worked in many more films such as Njan Ekananu (1982), Selvi (1985), Samsaram Adhu Minsaram (1986), Mappillai (1989), Valli (1993) and Sigamani Ramamani (2001). He appeared in more than fifty films in all the Malayalam, Tamil, and Kannada film industries. He was regular hero in Tamil films directed by Visu.

Partial filmography 

 1980 - Varumayin Niram Sivappu
 1981 - Rail Payanangalil
 1981 - Madhumalar
 1981 - Kilinjalgal
 1982 - Amma
 1982 - Nalanthana
 1982 - Ninaivellam Nithya
 1982 - Thunai
 1982 - Om Shakti
 1982 - Thottal Sudum
 1982 - Nirandharam
 1982 - Njan Ekananu (Malayalam)
 1983 - Thoongadhey Thambi Thoongadhey
 1983 - Soorapuli
 1983 - Yamirukka Bayamen
 1983 - Andha Silanatkal
 1984 - Oorukku Upadesam
 1984 - Thandikapatta Nyayangal
 1984 - Indina Ramayana (Kannada)
 1985 - Selvi
 1985 - Padikkadha Pannaiyar
 1985 - Chithirame Chithirame
 1986 - Samsaram Adhu Minsaram
 1987 - Enga Ooru Pattukaran
 1988 - Penmani Aval Kanmani
 1988 - Ennai Vittu Pogaathe
 1988 - Palaivanathil Pattampoochi
 1988 - Mappillai Sir
 1988 - Ennai Vittu Pogathe
 1988 - Solla Thudikuthu Manasu
 1989 - Pudhu Pudhu Arthangal 
 1989 - Shondham 16
 1989 - Sakalakala Sammandhi
 1989 - Orey Thai Orey Kulam
 1989 - Thaaya Tharama
 1989 - Mappillai
 1990 - Engal Swamy Ayyappan
 1990 - Mappillai Singam
 1990 - Pengal Veettin Kangal
 1990 - Vedikkai En Vadikkai
 1990 - Pudhu Varisu
 1990 - Shruthi (Kannada)
 1991 - Dharma Durai
 1991 - Nattai Thirudathe
 1993 - Valli
 1994 - Thuguve Krishnana (Kannada)
 1996 - Thavarina Tottilu (Kannada)
2001 - Sigamani Ramamani

Death
Dilip was suffering from a health ailment for the last few years of his life. He suffered a major heart attack and died on 25 May 2012. At the time of his death, Dilip was survived by his wife, his daughter Bhavya and son Mourya.

References

 https://web.archive.org/web/20120331102056/http://www.kattoor.com/cgibin/news/kattoornews.php?id=277&cat_id=12&p=
 http://www.supergoodmovies.com/45051/sandalwood/actor-dilip-dead-news-details

External links
 

Male actors in Tamil cinema
Male actors in Malayalam cinema
Indian male film actors
2012 deaths
20th-century Indian male actors
21st-century Indian male actors
Male actors from Chennai